The Nissan U-R  was a full-sized single-decker bus made by Nissan Motors/Datsun in the 1960s, available in two models: the UR-690 and NUR-690. The range was only available in a public bus configuration, can be either built as an integral bus or a bus chassis.

Specifications

Engines
The UR-690 and NUR-690 buses were rear engine models, powered by a UD3 3-cylinder diesel unit with 3706cc, giving 125 bhp at 2200rpm, and 45.5 kg-m torque at 1400rpm.

Capacity
The UR-690 is a 69-passenger vehicle, while the NUR-690 carries 64.

Suspension
Suspension on both models is by leaf springs front and rear, with shock absorbers on the front only.

U-R
Bus chassis
Buses of Japan
Full-size buses
Single-deck buses
Vehicles introduced in 1959